Habaguanex was a Native American (Taíno) chief (cacique) who controlled the area of Havana, Cuba.

See also
 List of famous Cubans
 List of Tainos
Taínos

Cuban people of Taíno descent
People from Havana
Taíno leaders
Taíno people
Tribal chiefs of the Caribbean